Schlicher Covered Bridge is a historic wooden covered bridge located at North Whitehall Township, Lehigh County, Pennsylvania. It has vertical plank siding and a gable roof. It crosses Jordan Creek.

It was listed on the National Register of Historic Places in 1980.

History
 Listed on the National Register of Historic Places in 1980,  the bridge was closed to traffic in 2009, and was scheduled to be replaced with a modern replica in 2013. In 2014, work on the reconstructed bridge was completed. The new bridge is longer and wider than the original. Construction cost $1.8 million and retained about 10% of the original materials.

References 

Covered bridges on the National Register of Historic Places in Pennsylvania
Covered bridges in Lehigh County, Pennsylvania
Bridges completed in 1882
Wooden bridges in Pennsylvania
Bridges in Lehigh County, Pennsylvania
Tourist attractions in Lehigh County, Pennsylvania
National Register of Historic Places in Lehigh County, Pennsylvania
Road bridges on the National Register of Historic Places in Pennsylvania
Burr Truss bridges in the United States